Rodolfo de Almeida Guimarães (born 3 May 1993), simply known as Rodolfo, is a Brazilian footballer who plays as an attacking midfielder.

Club career
Born in Mesquita, Rio de Janeiro, Rodolfo joined Flamengo's youth setup in 2012, initially on loan from Madureira, after a stint at Internacional. He was promoted to the former's main squad in 2013 by manager Dorival Júnior.

Rodolfo was a starter for Fla during 2013 and 2014 Campeonato Carioca, but made no appearances for the club in Série A. On 28 April 2014 he was loaned to Ponte Preta until the end of the year.

Rodolfo made his professional debut on 10 May, starting in a 2–1 home win against ABC for the Série B championship. He finished the campaign with 11 appearances, and subsequently returned to his parent club.

On 5 January 2015 Rodolfo joined Coritiba, also in a temporary deal.

References

External links

Rodolfo at ZeroZero

1993 births
Living people
Sportspeople from Rio de Janeiro (state)
Brazilian footballers
Association football midfielders
Campeonato Brasileiro Série A players
Campeonato Brasileiro Série B players
Saudi Professional League players
CR Flamengo footballers
Associação Atlética Ponte Preta players
Coritiba Foot Ball Club players
Grêmio Osasco Audax Esporte Clube players
Al-Hazem F.C. players
Oeste Futebol Clube players
Clube de Regatas Brasil players
Mirassol Futebol Clube players
Esporte Clube São Bento players
Jeonnam Dragons players
Expatriate footballers in Saudi Arabia
Brazilian expatriate sportspeople in Saudi Arabia
Expatriate footballers in South Korea
Brazilian expatriate sportspeople in South Korea